Shinkukaku Dam  is an earthfill dam located in Hokkaido Prefecture in Japan. The dam is used for irrigation. The catchment area of the dam is 43.1 km2. The dam impounds about 46  ha of land when full and can store 5600 thousand cubic meters of water. The construction of the dam was completed in 1970.

References

Dams in Hokkaido